Comparisons of media players are lists of digital media player hardware and software products that compare their features.
The lists are organized by medium and other characteristics.

Hardware

Comparison of portable media players, for portable hardware that play digital media
Comparison of digital media players, for digital media players

Software

Comparison of video player software, for software designed to play all digital media including video
Comparison of audio player software, for software specialized in playing audio and manage audio libraries
Comparison of free software for audio#Players
Comparison of DVR software packages
List of smart TV platforms
List of software based on Kodi and XBMC

Media players